The 1964–65 season was the 63rd season in which Dundee competed at a Scottish national level, playing in Division One, where the club would finish in 6th place for the second consecutive season. Domestically, Dundee would also compete in both the Scottish League Cup and the Scottish Cup, where they would be knocked out in the group stages of the League Cup, and by St Johnstone in the 1st round of the Scottish Cup. The club would return to European football, playing in the European Cup Winner's Cup, where they would be eliminated in the 2nd round by Spanish side Real Zaragoza. They would also compete in the Summer Cup. Dundee's long-time, league-winning manager Bob Shankly resigned in February 1965 to take the Hibernian job, and was replaced by former Dundee player Bobby Ancell a month later.

Scottish Division One 

Statistics provided by Dee Archive.

League table

Scottish League Cup 

Statistics provided by Dee Archive.

Group 4

Group 4 table

Scottish Cup 

Statistics provided by Dee Archive.

European Cup Winners' Cup 

Statistics provided by Dee Archive. Dundee would receive a bye in the 1st round.

Summer Cup 

Statistics provided by Dee Archive.

Group 2

Group table

Player statistics 
Statistics provided by Dee Archive

|}

See also 

 List of Dundee F.C. seasons

References

External links 

 1964-65 Dundee season on Fitbastats

Dundee F.C. seasons
Dundee